Beaumotte-Aubertans is a commune in the Haute-Saône department in the region of Bourgogne-Franche-Comté in eastern France.

Overview
The commune was created in December 1972 by merging the villages of Beaumotte-lès-Montbozon and Aubertans. Originally named Beaumotte-lès-Montbozon-et-Aubertans, the commune was renamed Beaumotte-Aubertans in 1977. The village of Aubertans is about 4.5 km to the north of the village now called Beaumotte-Aubertans.

The inhabitants of Beaumotte-Aubertans are called the Beaumottois, and the inhabitants of Aubertans are called the Aubertanois.

See also
Communes of the Haute-Saône department

References

Communes of Haute-Saône